The 2009 Vorarlberg state election was held on 20 September 2009 to elect the members of the Landtag of Vorarlberg.

The governing Austrian People's Party (ÖVP) retained their majority with losses, while the Freedom Party of Austria (FPÖ) recovered nearly all the losses it had suffered in 2004. The Social Democratic Party of Austria (SPÖ) lost much of their support and fell to fourth place behind The Greens, who stayed essentially level with the strong result they achieved in 2004. Governor Herbert Sausgruber was re-elected by the Landtag.

Background
In the 2004 election, the ÖVP achieved a strong result which allowed them to regain a comfortable majority. This was matched by major losses for the FPÖ, who fell from second to third place. Both the SPÖ and Greens also benefited. In addition, turnout fell catastrophically from 88% to just 60%.

Electoral system
The 36 seats of the Landtag of Vorarlberg are elected via open list proportional representation in a two-step process. The seats are distributed between four multi-member constituencies, corresponding to the districts of Vorarlberg. For parties to receive any representation in the Landtag, they must either win at least one seat in a constituency directly, or clear a 5 percent state-wide electoral threshold. Seats are distributed in constituencies according to the Hagenbach-Bischoff quota, with any remaining seats allocated at the state level, to ensure overall proportionality between a party's vote share and its share of seats.

Contesting parties
The table below lists parties represented in the previous Landtag.

In addition to the parties already represented in the Landtag, four parties collected enough signatures to be placed on the ballot.

 The Gsiberger (GSI)
 Alliance for the Future of Austria (BZÖ)
 wir-gemeinsam.at (WIR)
 Kiebitz

Result

Results by constituency

References

2009 elections in Austria
State elections in Austria
September 2009 events in Europe